The 1964–65 Sheffield Shield season was the 63rd season of the Sheffield Shield, the domestic first-class cricket competition of Australia. New South Wales won the championship.

Table

Statistics

Most Runs
Sam Trimble 924

Most Wickets
Neil Hawke 41

References

Sheffield Shield
Sheffield Shield
Sheffield Shield seasons